Bakers Corner is an unincorporated community in Adams Township, Hamilton County, Indiana.

History
A post office was established at Bakers Corner in 1873, and remained in operation until it was discontinued in 1900. Members of the Baker family served as early postmasters.

Geography

References

Unincorporated communities in Hamilton County, Indiana
Unincorporated communities in Indiana